Milwaukee Panthers basketball may refer to either of the basketball teams that represent the University of Wisconsin–Milwaukee:
Milwaukee Panthers men's basketball
Milwaukee Panthers women's basketball